Brooks is a town in Fayette County, Georgia, United States. As of the 2010 census, it had a population of 524.

Geography

Demographics

As of the census of 2010, there were 524 people, 195 households, and 165 families residing in the town. The racial makeup of the town was 96.18% White, .57% African American, 0.18% Native American, .57% Asian, and 1.72% from two or more races. Hispanic or Latino people of any race were 3.82% of the population.

There were 195 households, out of which 40.5% had children under the age of 18 living with them, 76.4% were married couples living together, 4.1% had a female householder with no husband present, and 14.9% were non-families. 12.8% of all households were made up of individuals, and 7.2% had someone living alone who was 65 years of age or older.  The average household size was 2.84 and the average family size was 3.08.

In the town, the population was spread out, with 26.8% under the age of 18, 6.9% from 18 to 24, 24.6% from 25 to 44, 29.5% from 45 to 64, and 12.3% who were 65 years of age or older.  The median age was 40 years. For every 100 females, there were 106.3 males.  For every 100 females age 18 and over, there were 105.6 males.

The median income for a household in the town was $65,000, and the median income for a family was $70,625. Males had a median income of $47,841 versus $22,000 for females. The per capita income for the town was $28,199.  About 1.6% of families and 2.0% of the population were below the poverty line, including none of those under age 18 and 1.9% of those age 65 or over.

History
Before white settlers came to the area, Creek Indians lived in the Brooks area. The first white settlers to reside in the area were the Haisten family. At first the town was called "Haistentown", but after several other names, Brooks became the name of the town in 1905, after a local planter, Hillery Brooks, who contributed greatly to the construction of the railroad and a much needed depot. During the Civil War, the town sent many young men to fight in the Confederate Army. Several of these men were killed during the war.

Economy

Past
By the 1900s Brooks began to grow due to the railroad. According to Daniel Langford Jr. several stores were built, including a bank, a drugstore, cotton gins, grist mills, and blacksmith shops. Although businesses were on the rise in the small town, the main source of economy for the town was farming.

Cotton was the number one crop for a long time until 1921 when the boll weevil appeared, quickly destroying crops, placing the town into an economic depression, and causing it to lose its charter. By the time the Great Depression struck the country, Brooks had been suffering for eight years. The town began to come out of the depression in 1939 after electricity was installed in the town. Around this time Brooks received its town charter again. Another factor in the growth of the town was due to the rise in the airline industry. Airline employees from Atlanta began to buy large tracts of farmland. Farming also changed as the focus switched from cotton to cattle.

Present
Today Brooks is still considered rural, but agriculture is no longer the main driver of the economy. Much of the town is being divided into  lots ready for the construction of homes. Brooks is now a residential area that many people are moving to since it is still considered to be rural. Many townspeople commute to work in Fayetteville or even Atlanta. Stores in town now include a women's hair salon and tanning shop, a barber shop, a deer processor, a storage center, and several convenience stores.

Education
Brooks' education falls under the Fayette County Board of Education. Middle school students attend Whitewater Middle, and high school students attend Whitewater High in Fayetteville, both of which are of recent construction.  Liberty Tech Charter school is using the old Brooks Elementary School building; there has been a school at this location since 1909. Brooks Elementary closed in 2013.

Activities
Besides activities at churches and schools, there is a youth recreational park which has baseball fields and football fields for the Brooks youth league. Brooks' roadways are often filled with bike riders, and many bicycle races come through the area. Other recreational activities in the area include horse riding, riding ATVs, fishing, and hunting.

References

External links
Town of Brooks official website

Towns in Fayette County, Georgia
Towns in Georgia (U.S. state)